Sam Sen station is a planned railway station on the SRT Dark Red Line and SRT Light Red Line in Thailand.

Station layout 

Railway stations in Thailand
SRT Red Lines